Chandrolsavam is a 2005 Indian Malayalam-language romantic drama film written and directed by Ranjith. It stars Mohanlal with Meena, Ranjith, Cochin Haneefa, VK Sreeraman, Santhosh and Jagadish in supporting roles. V. Dakshinamoorthy makes a cameo appearance as Sreehari's guru. The film features music composed by Vidyasagar.

Plot 

Sreehari (Mohanlal), the protagonist, was compelled to leave his village and home after being convicted for plotting a murder, and returns home after spending a year in jail and  living  in Paris for many years. Hari was in a deep relationship with Indu and their marital prospects were resisted by Indu's mother, Devaki (Nilambur Ayisha). She despises Hari's family due to their familial connection with her husband - who deserted the family and left with a Tamil lady. Balachandran, a close friend of Hari and Indu, double crosses the former and opts to marry Indu (Arranged by Devaki). On the wedding day, a lamenting Hari witnesses the marriage procession - only to intervene and rescue Balachandran, fatally attacked by Peethambaran (Bheeman Raghu). The latter blurts out that, Hari paid him for the attack and flees the scene. Devaki, is terrified and collapses at the spot. Indu doubts Hari's integrity.

Back home, he tries to get back every moment of his past-his teenage romance, the sights and sounds that he had once savoured because he does not have much life left, he is afflicted with cancer. Much of the story revolves around his childhood love Indu (Meena), and about the other two friends, one who turns out to be a husband of Indu and another one Ramanunni (Ranjith) who tried to kill her husband and tried to put the blame on Sreehari to get Indu. While Sreehari returns Indu was taking care of her bed ridden husband. After his return Sreehari proves his innocence to Indu and her husband. In an attempt to get Indu, Ramanunni kills Indu's husband.

Indu comes under the shelter of Sreehari, but she is kidnapped by Ramanunni and saved by Sreehari. Meanwhile, Doctor Durga (Khushbu Sundar) enters Sreehari home and everyone gets disappointed by her arrival as they want Indu to be united with Sreehari and Durga reveals the truth that she is running her hospital along with her husband in Delhi. And the patient (Sreehari) escaped from their hospital without their knowledge to come to his native village to see his childhood friends. Sreehari leaves with Indu and Durga for the treatment and viewers are left with a hopeful expectation that he will return healthy.

Cast

 Mohanlal as Chirackal Sreehari
 Meena as Indulekha
 Ranjith as Kalathil Ramanunni
 Cochin Haneefa as Sreedharan
 V. K. Sreeraman as Kunjambu
 Santhosh as Sahadevan
 Jagadish as Kuttiraman
 Sujatha as K. P. Bhavaniamma
 Khushbu as Dr. Durga Chandrashekhar (Voice over by Revathi)
 Sai Kumar as Karunan
 Samvrutha Sunil as Malavika
 Jayakrishnan as Naveen
 Murali Menon as Balachandran
 Meena Ganesh as Madhavi
 Maniyanpilla Raju as C.I Sugathan
 Spadikam George as C.I Kurian George
 Bheeman Raghu as Ingapara "Pothu" Peethambaran
 Zeenath as Santha
 Jayan Cherthala as Chandrashekharan
 Augustine as Jose
 Abu Salim as Kelu
 Nisha Sarang
 Nilambur Ayisha as Devakiamma
 Oduvil Unnikrishnan- Cameo appearance
 V. Dakshinamoorthy - Cameo appearance
 Vijayan Kranthoor

Soundtrack

The soundtrack was composed by Vidyasagar with lyrics by Gireesh Puthenchery.

Release
The film released on Vishu. It was a box office flop, but later became popular through television and social networks like YouTube.

Reception
Sify.com wrote that "Meena sans any make-up has a meaty role as Indu and she has given an excellent performance. Tamil actor Renjit as Ramaunni is impressive and stands up to Mohanlal's performance. The melodious songs of Vidyasagar are hummable and V. Dakshinamoorthy makes a special appearance as Sri Hari's guru. Azhagappan's camera has etched the lush green locales of Shornur and Ottapalam aesthetically"

References

External links
 

2000s Malayalam-language films
Indian romantic drama films
Indian films about cancer
Films shot in Palakkad
Films shot in Ottapalam
Films shot at Varikkasseri Mana
Films directed by Ranjith
Films scored by Vidyasagar